Andy Bishop (born May 26, 1965) is a retired American professional racing cyclist from Tucson.  He finished three Tour de Frances, riding with the Team Classification winners  in 1988.  In 1995, he won the Herald Sun Tour. He lives in Williston, Vermont and has two children, Summer and Baxter. He is now a full-time professional photographer and is owner of Andy Bishop Photography. He coaches former national champion mountain biker Lea Davison.

Major results
Sources:

1987
 1st  Overall Tour of the Gila
 1st Stage 7 Peace Race
1989
 1st Stages 4 & 6 Ruta Mexico
 9th Overall Tour of America
 10th Halle–Ingooigem
1990
 1st Stage 7 Tour DuPont
 2nd Road race, National Championships
 5th Philadelphia International Cycling Classic
 10th Overall Vuelta a Venezuela
1991
 6th (TTT) GP de la Libération
 9th Thrift Drug Classic
1992
 2nd Road race, National Championships
 2nd Druivenkoers Overijse
 2nd Thrift Drug Classic
 5th Philly Cycling Classic
 7th Overall Tour de Luxembourg
1993
 5th Thrift Drug Classic
 8th Overall Tour de Luxembourg
 8th Trofeo Laigueglia
1995
 1st  Overall Herald Sun Tour
1st  Points classification
1st Stage 6
 3rd Overall Killington Stage Race
 4th Lancaster Classic
 4th Thrift Drug Classic
 6th Norwest Cycling Cup
 10th First Union Grand Prix
1996
 5th Overall Tour of China
 7th Overall Herald Sun Tour
1st Stage 9
1998
 1st Stage 12 Ruta Mexico

General classification results timeline

References

External links
 

American male cyclists
Living people
1965 births